William Wilson (8 April 1925 – 19 April 2005) was a South African cricketer. He played in twenty-five first-class matches from 1945/46 to 1960/61.

References

External links
 

1925 births
2005 deaths
South African cricketers
Border cricketers
Eastern Province cricketers
Western Province cricketers
Cricketers from Port Elizabeth